Sunset Drive, also known as Southwest 72nd Street is a  east–west arterial road traversing the southwestern suburbs of Miami, Florida, from the northwestern portions of the Kendall area to Coral Gables. A central portion of Sunset Drive is maintained by the Florida Department of Transportation as State Road 986 (SR 986), which runs from the Homestead Extension (HEFT) underpass to Southwest 69th Avenue and is signed through South Miami to US 1.

Route description

Western section

Southwest 72nd Street begins as a private dirt road accessing farmland in unincorporated Miami-Dade County, north of The Hammocks and west of Kendall West. The road heads east and, upon reaching 167th Avenue, it becomes a paved four-laned divided road. From here to its eastern terminus, Southwest 72nd Street is given the designation of Marjory Stoneman Douglas Sunset Drive.

After another mile (1.6 km), and after passing by more residential neighborhoods, Sunset Drive crosses Southwest 147th Avenue and enters the unincorporated Kendale Lakes. The road passes one block to the south of the Miccosukee Golf & Country Club, and continues east between the backs of residential neighborhoods for another , older than those lying to the west, with the only break being Miami Sunset Senior High. After crossing Southwest 127th Avenue, Sunset Drive's character changes as it passes by churches, schools, large-lot houses and market gardens until it reaches the HEFT.

State Road 986 section

The locations of both termini of State Road 986 are unclear, with some commercial mapping and even Florida Department of Transportation (FDOT) material showing the western terminus of SR 986 at Southwest 127th Avenue and the eastern terminus at either the South Dixie Highway (US 1) or Red Road. According to the FDOT road inventory, the western terminus of SR 986 lies where Sunset Drive passes under the HEFT without an interchange, with the section of road west to Southwest 127th Avenue acknowledged as lying off the Florida State Highway System.

East of the HEFT underpass, SR 986 leaves Kendale Lakes and enters the Kendall district proper, cutting across its northwestern corner. Sunset Drive first passes a small shopping district and then goes between two residential neighborhoods. Once past SR 985, Sunset Drive almost-immediately crosses the Snapper Creek Canal and enters the eponymous community of Sunset. SR 986 then passes a mixture of houses, strip malls, commercial services and churches for the next , whereupon it crosses a CSX railroad and passes under the Don Shula Expressway (SR 874) without an interchange. After another  of strip malls, SR 986 crosses Galloway Road (SR 973) and enters the community of Glenvar Heights. East of Galloway Road, SR 986 gains a leafy residential character, reaching the Palmetto Expressway (SR 826) interchange after . SR 986 carries on east through more leafy neighborhoods for another . Here, the SR 986 designation stops at Southwest 69th Avenue, the boundary between Glenvar Heights and the incorporated city of South Miami. Like at its western terminus, the FDOT inventory recognises Sunset Drive as far east as Red Road (approximately ) as lying off the State Highway System.

Eastern section

Sunset Drive continues east from SR 986's eastern terminus through leafy neighborhoods of western South Miami. The road's character changes once it passes Southwest 63rd Avenue, as Sunset Drive begins to enter South Miami's central business district, passing by low-rise apartment buildings, multi-storeyed office complexes, and the South Miami Hospital. At Southwest 62nd Avenue, eastbound motorists on Sunset Drive wishing to head north along US 1 are encouraged by signage to detour along it, while Sunset Drive continues east for  through the civic heart of South Miami, including a section of road paved with red brick near the city hall. The road then passes under the elevated Metrorail tracks, just to the south of South Miami Metrorail station, and immediately meets the South Dixie Highway (US 1) at an oblique intersection.

East of US 1, Sunset Drive scales down to become an undivided two-laned shopping street for the next two blocks, reaching Red Road (Southwest 57th Avenue) after . On the other side, Sunset Drive leaves South Miami and forms the boundary between Coral Gables, to the north, and an unincorporated section of Miami-Dade County to the south. After passing between shops on the northern side of the road and houses on the southern side, Sunset Drive enters an opulent, leafy residential neighborhood, eventually losing its kerbing, and crossing entirely into Coral Gables about  later.

History

In 1996, the Florida State Legislature passed a resolution renaming SR 986 as Marjory Stoneman Douglas Sunset Drive.

Until 1997, its eastern terminus was three blocks further to the east of US 1 at Red Road, to intersect with a since-truncated SR 959 on the South Miami-Coral Gables boundary.

Major intersections

See also

References

Roads in Miami-Dade County, Florida